Indian Church may refer to:
 Indian Church, Belize, a village in Orange Walk District, Belize
 Old Indian Meeting House, an historic church and meeting house in Mashpee, Massachusetts
 The Indian Church (painting), a 1929 painting by Emily Carr

See also
 Christianity in India 
Church of India (disambiguation)